Garden River Airport  is located  north of Garden River, Alberta, Canada.

References

External links
Page about this airport on COPA's Places to Fly airport directory

Registered aerodromes in Alberta
Wood Buffalo National Park